Otis Duncan may refer to:
Otis B. Duncan, commander of a battalion of the 370th Infantry Regiment during World War One
Otis D. Duncan, sociologist